The Boston Camera, also known as Pie Face and officially classified as the K-42 Camera Model, was a prototype airborne photo reconnaissance camera manufactured for the United States Air Force by Boston University in 1951 and tested on the Convair B-36 and the C-97 Stratofreighter. The model carried on the first ERB-36D (44-92088) had a  focal length, which was achieved using a series of lenses and mirrors. The camera used  negatives. The camera was installed aboard Boeing C-97A 49-2592 (not an "RC-97" or "EC-97" as often widely quoted) which was used operationally by the 7405th Support Squadron based at Wiesbaden, West Germany between 1952 and 1962. It was given to the Air Force Museum in 1964, along with a contact print of a golf ball on a course.

In the words of CIA historian Dino Brugioni:
The lens was designed in 1947 by Dr. James Baker for installation in a camera designed by the Boston University Optical Research Laboratory. The camera weighed about three tons, and eight hundred pounds of lead shot were required to balance it. Supposedly, it was first installed and test-flown in an RB-36, then installed as a left-looking oblique camera in an RC-97. The first photo Arthur Lundahl and I saw from this project was of New York City. The aircraft was seventy-two miles away, and yet we could see people in Central Park.

The Boston Camera was plagued with problems that caused it to vibrate and produce smearing on the newspaper-sized negative, so that photo interpreters would see several smeared frames along with several clear ones. It is currently displayed at the National Museum of the US Air Force in Dayton, Ohio.

From the display placard: 

This camera, manufactured for the US Air Force by Boston University in 1951, is the largest aerial camera ever built.  It was installed in an RB-36D in 1954 and tested for about a year.  Later it was used in a C-97 aircraft flying along the air corridor through communist East Germany to Berlin, but a 10,000 ft (3,000 m) altitude restriction imposed by the communists made the camera less useful than at a higher altitude.  It was also used on reconnaissance missions along the borders of Eastern European nations.  The camera made an 18 x 36 inch negative and was so powerful a photo interpreter could detect a golf ball from an altitude of 45,000 feet (14,000 m).  Dr. James Baker of Harvard University designed the camera.  

Technical Notes:

Shutter Speed: 1/400 sec

Weight: 6,500 lbs (3 metric ton) (camera and aircraft mount)

References

Aerial cameras
Boston University
Military cartography